Naranjargalyn Batjargal (born 21 January 1972) is a Mongolian weightlifter. He competed in the men's bantamweight event at the 1992 Summer Olympics.

References

External links
 

1972 births
Living people
Mongolian male weightlifters
Olympic weightlifters of Mongolia
Weightlifters at the 1992 Summer Olympics
Place of birth missing (living people)
20th-century Mongolian people
21st-century Mongolian people